Bartlett Peak is a summit in Yosemite National Park, California.

Bartlett Peak was named for G. H. C. Bartlett, a professor at West Point.

References

Mountains of Tuolumne County, California
Mountains of Northern California